UML Designer is an open-source UML tool based on Sirius and Eclipse. The project is licensed under the EPL.

UML2 
UML Designer is a graphical modeling tool for UML2 based on the Eclipse UML2 plugin and as defined by OMG. It provides support for the main UML diagrams and for UML profiles.

Domain specific approach 
As it is based on Sirius, the UML models could be combined with Domain Specific Modeling. Each diagram definition could be extended and adapted to specific user needs or combine it to Domain Specific Languages.

Releases 
 First stable release: UML Designer 1.0 available since 2012
 Latest stable release: UML Designer 9.0 available since 30 January 2019

Compatibility 

The latest release of UML Designer is compatible with the following version of Eclipse:
 Eclipse Oxygen

UML Designer is based on the UML2 Eclipse plugin. Thus it is compatible with any tool that can produce UML2 compatible models.

Modules are available through the Eclipse Marketplace to combine it with SysML or to directly generate code (Java or C).

Community and communication 
The UML Designer community is gathered around the UML Designer website and the documentation is accessible online.

References

External links
Official website
Eclipse Marketplace
Source code repository
Obeo, creator of the project

Free UML tools
Eclipse (software)